Gawler River may refer to:
 Gawler River (South Australia), a river in South Australia.
 Gawler River, South Australia, a town in South Australia.
 Gawler River (Tasmania), a river in Tasmania.

See also
Gawler (disambiguation)